Aleksandr Nikolayevich Kryuchkov (born 20 July 1985) is a Russian football player.

Club career
He made his debut in the Russian Premier League for FC Arsenal Tula on 21 March 2015 in a game against PFC CSKA Moscow, he played the full game. The game was moved to Moscow due to unacceptable pitch conditions in Tula and Arsenal's manager Dmitri Alenichev fielded the reserve squad in protest.

He played his next game above the third tier of Russian football on 1 August 2020, when he started for FC Dynamo Bryansk in their Russian Football National League game against FC Orenburg.

References

External links
 
 
 Profile by Russian Football National League
 

1985 births
Sportspeople from Tula Oblast
People from Tula Oblast
Living people
Russian footballers
Association football defenders
FC Arsenal Tula players
FC Spartak Kostroma players
FC Dynamo Bryansk players
Russian Premier League players